The Motorav 2.6 R is a Brazilian aircraft engine, designed and produced by Motorav of Bocaiúva Minas Gerais for use in ultralight and homebuilt aircraft.

Design and development
The engine is a four-cylinder four-stroke, horizontally-opposed,  displacement, air-cooled,  direct-drive, gasoline engine design. It employs capacitor discharge ignition and produces  at 2800 rpm.

Specifications (2.6 R)

See also

References

External links

Motorav aircraft engines
Air-cooled aircraft piston engines
2010s aircraft piston engines